Dan + Shay (the plus symbol substituting for an ampersand as an 'and' indicator) is an American country pop music duo composed of vocalists and songwriters Dan Smyers and Shay Mooney. They are signed to Warner Records Nashville and have released four albums, Where It All Began, Obsessed, Dan + Shay, and Good Things. Of their nine singles, five have topped the Country Airplay chart and two have topped the Hot Country Songs chart. In addition to their own material, the group's members have collaborated with Justin Bieber, Rascal Flatts, Lindsey Stirling, RaeLynn, and Kelly Clarkson. From 2019 to 2021, the duo won three consecutive Grammy Awards for Best Country Duo/Group Performance for the songs "Tequila", "Speechless", and "10,000 Hours". Awarded 2 iHeartRadio Music Awards along with the accomplishment of reaching 1 Billion Total Audience Spins for “Tequila”

History

2013–2015: Where It All Began

Before the duo's foundation, Mooney was a solo artist on T-Pain's Nappy Boy Entertainment label and Smyers was a member of a group called Bonaventure as well as a previous member of the band Transition on Floodgate Records. The two met in Nashville, Tennessee, in December 2012 at Dan's house during a party. There they would perform together for the first time and started writing the day after they met. The first song they ever wrote together got put on hold for Rascal Flatts. Within two months, the duo had multiple publishing offers and signed with Warner/Chappell Music.

On October 14, 2013, the debut single, "19 You + Me", was released to country radio.  Dan + Shay wrote the song with Danny Orton. The song received a positive review at Taste of Country which praised the "warm details" and "emotion." Their debut album, Where It All Began, was released on April 1, 2014, which Orton produced with Scott Hendricks. The album's second single, "Show You Off", was released to country radio on May 12, 2014. They performed on The Ellen DeGeneres Show, performing "19 You + Me" in 2014. They made their Grand Ole Opry debut on February 1, 2014. They also received a 2014 Academy of Country Music Awards Vocal Duo of the Year nomination. The album's third single, "Nothin' Like You", was released to country radio on February 23, 2015. It reached number one on the Country Airplay chart in December 2015.

Dan + Shay was the opening act for Hunter Hayes on his We're Not Invisible Tour, which began in March 2014. Dan + Shay opened for Blake Shelton on the 2014 leg of his Ten Times Crazier Tour. The tour began in June 2014 and ended in October 2014. Following the end of the Ten Times Crazier Tour, Dan + Shay embarked on their own 10-date headlining tour, entitled the "Where It All Began Tour." The tour began on October 9, 2014, in Minneapolis and concluded in Columbus, Ohio, on October 26, 2014. After the conclusion of the "Where It All Began Tour," Dan + Shay set out on the road once more with Hunter Hayes on his Tattoo (Your Name) Tour.

2015–2017: Obsessed

In August 2015, the duo announced the Just the Right Kind of Crazy Tour across the Midwest and eastern United States. Their second album's first single, "From the Ground Up", was released to country radio in February 2016. On June 3, 2016, the duo released their second studio album, Obsessed. The album's second single, "How Not To", was released to country radio on September 26, 2016. The duo joined Darius Rucker on his Good for a Good Time Tour from June - September 2016. In November 2016, the duo started their The Obsessed Tour and continued to support it until April 2017. It reached number one on the Country Airplay chart in July 2017. The album's third single, "Road Trippin'", was released to country radio on July 17, 2017. In 2017, the duo supported Thomas Rhett on his Home Team Tour.

2018: Dan + Shay

In January 2018, it was announced that the duo joined Rascal Flatts on the Back to Us Tour. In January 2018, the duo released "Tequila", the lead single from their self-titled third studio album, which was released on June 22, 2018. "Tequila" has since become their highest-charting effort on the US Billboard Hot 100, with it reaching the top 40. On August 6, 2018, the duo released the second single from the album "Speechless". The album also features a collaboration with Kelly Clarkson on "Keeping Score". From October to December the duo supported Chris Young on his Losing Sleep World Tour. On February 11, 2019, the duo released the third single from the album "All to Myself". In August, they released Dan + Shay (The Vocals), which includes the vocal tracks of the two singles from the album.

2019–present: Good Things

From February to April, the duo went on their 2019 Dan + Shay Tour. On March 27, 2019, it was announced that the duo would join Shawn Mendes in Australian and New Zealand on his 2019 tour. On October 4, 2019, they released "10,000 Hours", a collaboration with Canadian singer-songwriter Justin Bieber, after his and Hailey Bieber's wedding in South Carolina on September 30, 2019. The song debuted at number 4 on the Billboard Hot 100 and also won the Grammy Award for Best Country Duo/Group Performance. The duo co-wrote Eric Ethridge's 2020 single "Dream Girl". From June to September 2019, the duo supported Florida Georgia Line on their Can't Say I Ain't Country Tour. In October 2019, the duo announced their Dan + Shay The (Arena) Tour originally set to start in March 2020. The Band Camino and Ingrid Andress were announced as opening acts. On March 12, 2020, after performing in Columbus, the duo announced the tour would be postponed to summer and fall 2020. Dates were postponed again to 2021, which also led to some cancellations after they were unable to reschedule from 2020 postponements. On July 31, 2020, the duo released the second single from the album, "I Should Probably Go to Bed". On February 5, 2021, they released the third single from the album, "Glad You Exist". On July 16, 2021, the duo announced their fourth album Good Things while releasing the album's title track "Good Things" as a single and revealing the album's release date of August 13, 2021. On August 16, 2021, "Steal My Love" was released as the album's fourth single. In August 2021, the duo collaborated with Carrie Underwood on a cover of "Only Us" from Dear Evan Hansen, which they recorded for the soundtrack album of the musical's 2021 film adaptation. It was released as a single on September 3, 2021. On November 2, 2021, the duo revealed they had to cancel two shows, in Orlando and Atlanta, on their Dan + Shay The (Arena) Tour due to a positive COVID-19 test within their touring camp. On July 18, 2022, "You" was released as the album's fifth single.

In popular culture
The Dan + Shay song "Stop Drop + Roll" was featured on the Nashville season two episode "Your Good Girl's Gonna Go Bad". They were also featured on The Bachelorette in an episode that aired on June 7, 2016.

The duo also collaborated with violinist, dancer, and YouTuber Lindsey Stirling on a song from her third album Brave Enough. The song was entitled "Those Days", and the album was released on August 19, 2016. In 2017, the duo were featured on CMT Crossroads, along with Earth, Wind & Fire.

In 2018, the duo was featured on The Voice with Chevel Shepherd. On May 19, 2019, the duo performed their song "Speechless" with American Idol Top 3 contestant Madison VanDenburg. In 2020, the duo was featured on The Not-Too-Late Show with Elmo!. In 2021, the duo was featured on The Voice for a second time, and was Blake Shelton's Battle Advisors.

Musical style and influences
Dan + Shay's musical style has been described as country, country pop, and pop. They also utilize elements of pop, country rock, soft rock, and R&B. In describing their sound, Stephen Thomas Erlewine of AllMusic stated, "specializing in country-pop so smooth it would also sound at home on adult contemporary radio" and "their inherent sweetness served as a counterpoint to the swaggering bro-country that dominated mainstream country during the mid-2010s." Taste of Country compared them to Rascal Flatts and Love and Theft.

The duo has cited many musical influences. Dan Smyers cited artists such as Ryan Adams, Tom Petty, Kenny Chesney and Alison Krauss as musical influences. Shay Mooney cited artists such as Rascal Flatts, Dave Matthews Band, Usher and Kenny Chesney as musical influences. Billboard noted musical influences from The Beach Boys, Electric Light Orchestra, Alan Jackson and Brooks & Dunn on the duo's fourth album, Good Things. According to Dan Smyers in an interview:

Members

Dan Smyers

Daniel "Dan" Smyers, born  was raised in Wexford, Pennsylvania, where he attended North Allegheny Senior High School. He started playing music at the age of 12. Smyers attended Carnegie Mellon University with plans to study finance and play football. He moved to Nashville in 2010, after graduating from college the same year. Two years later he would meet Shay.

Prior to joining Dan + Shay, Smyers fronted an emo band called Transition, which released one full-length record in 2006 on Floodgate Records produced by Mike Herrera, who is best known for his work with MxPx. Transition appeared on the Vans Warped Tour in both 2004 and 2006, and had opened for bands including All Time Low, MxPx, Streetlight Manifesto & Reel Big Fish He was also in a rock band called Bonaventure. 
Instruments: Vocals, Guitar, Bass, Piano

Smyers and Abby Law were in a relationship for many years before becoming engaged in 2016 and were married on May 13, 2017.  Law made a cameo in a Dan + Shay videos for their songs "Nothin' Like You", “Speechless” and "10,000 Hours". Smyers and Abby work with Wags & Walks Rescue Nashville to save dogs and place them in their forever homes. They have five dogs together as of March 2021.

Shay Mooney

James Shay Mooney, born  was raised in Natural Dam, Arkansas, and was home-schooled until the fifth-grade, but later attended Union Christian Academy and Van Buren High School. At the age of 14, he started writing songs, and at 16, he started learning how to play guitar. Following high school, he attended Valley Forge Christian College for one year before completely pursuing his music career. Mooney had a record deal with rapper T-Pain on Pain's Nappy Boy Entertainment label. However, the deal ended once he formed Dan + Shay.

Instruments: Vocals, Piano, Guitar

On January 24, 2017, his fiancée Hannah Billingsley gave birth to their son, Asher James Mooney. Mooney and Billingsley were married on October 20, 2017, in Arkansas.  On February 21, 2020, the couple welcomed their second son, Ames Alexander Mooney.

Discography

Studio albums
 Where It All Began (2014)
 Obsessed (2016)
 Dan + Shay (2018)
 Good Things (2021)

Filmography

Awards and nominations

Tours

Headlining:
Where It All Began Tour (2014–2015)
Just the Right Kind of Crazy Tour (2015)
The Obsessed Tour (2016–2017)
Dan + Shay Tour (2019)
Dan + Shay The (Arena) Tour (2020–2021)

Supporting:
We're Not Invisible Tour (2014) 
Ten Times Crazier Tour (2014) 
Tattoo (Your Name) Tour (2014) 
Good for a Good Time Tour (2016) 
Home Team Tour (2017) 
Back to Us Tour (2018) 
 Losing Sleep World Tour (2018) 
Can't Say I Ain't Country Tour (2019) 
Shawn Mendes: The Tour (2019)

Touring band
Justin Richards – guitar
Dustin Hook – bass
Andrew Cook – drums
Izaac Burkhart – guitar, keys, backing vocals

References

External links

Official website

Country music groups from Tennessee
Country pop duos
Musical groups from Nashville, Tennessee
Musical groups established in 2012
Warner Records artists
2012 establishments in Tennessee
American musical duos
Male musical duos
Grammy Award winners